Bread and circuses was how the Roman poet Juvenal characterized the imperial leadership's way of placating the masses.

Bread and Circuses may also refer to:

Literature
"The Code of Romulus" or "Bread and Circuses", a 2007 short story by Caroline Lawrence

Music
, an album by members of the Tropicalismo movement
Bread and Circuses (Colosseum album), 1997
Bread and Circuses (Graham Collier album), 2002
Bread and Circuses (The View album), 2011
Bread & Circus (Toad the Wet Sprocket album), 1989
The Greatest Story Never Told Chapter 2: Bread and Circuses, a 2012 album by rapper Saigon
"Bread and Circuses", the opening track of Harmony No Harmony by British post-hardcore band Million Dead

Television
"Bread and Circuses" (Star Trek: The Original Series), a 1968 episode of Star Trek
"Bread and Circuses" (Hell on Wheels), a 2011 episode of Hell on Wheels
"Bread and Circuses" (The Last Ship), a 2017 episode of The Last Ship

See also
Bread & Circus (store), a grocery store chain now part of Whole Foods Market
Bread & Circus, a 1989 album by Toad the Wet Sprocket
Pan y Circo, a 2020 Mexican TV series
 or Bread and Games, Germany's biggest Roman festival
"Panis et Cirsenses", the opening track on the debut album by Brazilian band Os Mutantes